Persoonia brevifolia is a plant in the family Proteaceae and is endemic to a restricted area near the border between south-eastern New South Wales and Victoria. It is an erect shrub with elliptic to egg-shaped leaves and cylindrical yellow flowers arranged singly in leaf axils.

Description
The upper surface is distinctly darker than the lower surface. Flowering occurs from December to March the fruit is an oval drupe.

Taxonomy
This geebung was first formally described in 1870 by George Bentham and given the name Persoonia myrtilloides var. brevifolia in Flora Australiensis, from specimens collected by Ferdinand von Mueller at "Upper Genoa River and Nangatta Mountains up to  elevation". In 1991, Lawrie Johnson and Peter Weston raised the variety to species status as Persoonia brevifolia in the journal Telopea.

Distribution and habitat

References

brevifolia
Flora of New South Wales
Flora of Victoria (Australia)
Plants described in 1870
Taxa named by George Bentham